Inzigkofen is a municipality in the district of Sigmaringen in Baden-Württemberg in Germany.  Historically, it is part of the Swabian north Alpine foreland basin.

It consists of three districts:

Within Engelswies is the now-abandoned Talsberg quarry, known for its fossiliferous layers, and the site of evidence of the oldest Eurasian hominoids; a molar tooth found there in June 1973 was reported in June 2011 to have been "dated with relative precision at 17 to 17.1 Ma" (million years ago).

Mayors
In November 2004 Bernd Gombold, was elected mayor with 96,8 % of the vote.

 1946–1949: Fridolin Oswald
 1949–1966: Johann Scherer
 1967–1972: Manfred Sailer
 1973–2005: Pius Widmer
 since 2005: Bernd Gombold

References

Sigmaringen (district)
Paleontological sites of Europe